The International Criminal Justice Review is a quarterly peer-reviewed academic journal that covers the field of criminal law. The editor-in-chief is Scott Jacques (Georgia State University). The journal was established in 1991 and is published by SAGE Publications in association with the Andrew Young School of Policy Studies (Georgia State University).

Abstracting and indexing 
The journal is abstracted and indexed in:
 Criminal Justice Abstracts
 PAIS International
 ProQuest databases
 SafetyLit
 Sociological Abstracts

External links 
 

SAGE Publishing academic journals
English-language journals
Criminology journals